Field guns are one of two primary types of field artillery.  Guns fire a heavy shell on a relatively level trajectory from a longer barrel, allowing for very high muzzle velocity and good range performance.  Guns are most adequate for providing long range fire support and counter-battery fire.

Towed field guns

Self-propelled field guns

Notes and references

 
Field gun